Ezinkulu is an album by the South African isicathamiya group Ladysmith Black Mambazo. The album featured songs included "How Long Should I Wait" and "Hello My Baby", the first English-language songs sung by the group. The album (#BL 186) was recorded on April 19, 1979, and released later that month.

Track listing
 "Bamnqobile"
 "Hello My Baby"
 "Siyakhanya Isibane"
 "Woza Sambe"
 "Hamishaweta"
 "Amafutha Esibane"
 "Jubilee"
 "How Long Should I Wait"
 "Bayasithanda"
 "We Dudu We Themba Lami"
 "Bhayi Bhayi Lindiwe"
 "Kura Gazankulu"

1979 albums
Ladysmith Black Mambazo albums